The Conquest of the Desert was an Argentine military campaign directed mainly by General Julio Argentino Roca in the 1870s with the intention of establishing dominance over the Patagonian Desert, inhabited primarily by indigenous peoples. The Conquest of the Desert extended Argentine territories into Patagonia and ended Chilean expansion in the region.

Argentine troops killed more than 1,000 Mapuche, displaced over 15,000 more from their traditional lands and enslaved a portion of the remaining natives. Settlers of European descent moved in and developed the lands through irrigation for agriculture, turning the territory into a breadbasket that contributed to the emergence of Argentina as an agricultural superpower in the early 20th century. 

The Conquest is controversial. Apologists describe it as a civilising mission, while revisionists label it a genocide.

Background
The arrival of the Spanish colonists on the shores of the Río de la Plata and the foundation of the city of Buenos Aires during the 16th century led directly to the first confrontations between the Spanish and the local Indian tribes, mainly the Querandí (also called the Pampas). Spanish had purchased the Buenos Aires hinterland from the local Indians to be used for cattle raising. This use displaced most of the animals traditionally hunted by the natives and they struggled to survive. The Indians fought those in the towns, raiding many cattle and horses that altered Native homelands. In retaliation, the Spanish colonists built forts and launched attacks.

As more settlers developed properties, the frontier dividing the colonial farms and the Indian territories gradually moved outwards from Buenos Aires; at the end of the 18th century, the Salado River was the boundary between the civilizations. Due to land loss and environmental devastation brought by cattle, many Indians were forced to abandon their tribes to work on the farms. Some assimilated or intermarried with the white population. The mixed race gauchos developed from those men who worked on the ranches.

After Argentina achieved independence in 1816, the provinces had numerous conflicts as they struggled over how to organize. Once these were settled, the government wanted to quickly occupy the lands claimed by the young republic (in part to prevent Chile from enforcing its claim to the same land). It also wanted to increase the national agricultural production and offer new lands to prospective immigrants.

In 1833, Juan Manuel de Rosas in Buenos Aires Province and other military leaders in the Cuyo region coordinated offensives to try to exterminate the resistant indigenous tribes, but only Rosas's expedition achieved some success. By this time Chile had founded Punta Arenas in Magellan Strait in 1845, which threatened the Argentine claims in Patagonia. Later in 1861, Chile began the occupation of Araucanía, which alarmed Argentine authorities because of its rival's growing influence in the zone. Chile had defeated the Mapuche in their central region. This indigenous tribe had strong language and cultural ties to the nomadic tribes on the east side of the Andes, with whom they share the same language.

In 1872, the indigenous leader Calfucurá and his 6,000 followers attacked the cities of General Alvear, Veinticinco de Mayo and Nueve de Julio. They killed 300 settlers and drove off 200,000 head of cattle. These events were a catalyst for the government to mount the Conquest of the Desert.

The Indians drove the stolen cattle from the incursions (malones) to Chile through the Rastrillada de los chilenos and traded them for goods. The historian George V. Rauch notes evidence that Chilean authorities knew about the origin of the cattle and consented to the trading in order to strengthen their influence over Patagonian territories. They expected eventually to occupy those lands in the future.

Alsina's campaign

In 1875, Adolfo Alsina, Minister of War under President Nicolás Avellaneda, presented the government with a plan which he later described as having the goal "to populate the desert, and not to destroy the Indians."

The first step was to connect Buenos Aires and the Fortines (fortresses) with telegraph lines. The government signed a peace treaty with chieftain Juan José Catriel. But he broke it a short time later, as together with chieftain Manuel Namuncurá and 3,500 warriors, he attacked Tres Arroyos, Tandil, Azul, and other towns and farms. The casualties were higher than in 1872: Catriel and Namuncurá's forces killed 400 settlers, captured another 300, and drove off 300,000 head of cattle.

Alsina attacked the Indians, forcing them to fall back, and leaving fortines on his way south to protect the conquered territories. He also constructed the 374 km long trench named zanja de Alsina ("Alsina's trench"). It was supposed to be a fortified border to the unconquered territories.  Three metres wide and two metres deep, it served as an obstacle to cattle drives by the Indians.

The Indians continued taking cattle from farms in the Buenos Aires Province and south of the Mendoza Province, but found it difficult to escape as the animals slowed their march. They had to confront the patrolling units that followed them. As the war went on, some Indians eventually signed peace treaties and settled among the "Christians" behind the lines of forts. Some tribes allied with the Argentine government, standing neutral or, less often, fighting for the Argentine army. In return, they were granted periodical shipments of cattle and food. After Alsina died in 1877, Julio Argentino Roca was appointed Minister of War, and decided to change the strategy.

Roca's campaign
 
In contrast to Alsina, Julio Argentino Roca believed that the only solution against the Indian threat was to extinguish, subdue or expel them.

At the end of 1878 he started the first sweep to "clean" the area between the Alsina trench and the Negro river by continuous and systematic attacks on the Indian settlements. On 6 December 1878, elements of the Puán Division under Colonel Teodoro García clashed with a native war party at the Lihué Calel heights. In a brief but hard fought battle, 50 Indians were killed, 270 captured, and 33 settlers were freed.

Numerous armed encounters would follow, until by December 1878, over 4,000 Indians had been captured and 400 killed, 150 settlers freed, and 15,000 head of cattle recovered.

With 6,000 soldiers armed with new breech-loading Remington rifles, in 1879 General Roca began the second sweep, reaching Choele Choel in two months, after killing 1,313 Indians and capturing over 15,000. From other points, southbound companies made their way down to the Negro River and the Neuquén River, a northern tributary of the Negro River. Together, both rivers marked the natural frontier from the Andes to the Atlantic Ocean. This attack led to a large migration of Mapuche into the zone around Curarrehue and Pucón, Chile.

Many European-Argentinian settlements were built on the basin of these two rivers, as well as a number on the Colorado River. By sea, some settlements were erected on the southern basin of the Chubut River, mainly by Welsh colonists at y Wladfa.

The final campaign
Roca was elected and followed Nicolás Avellaneda as president. He thought it was imperative to conquer the territory south of the Negro River as soon as possible, and ordered the 1881 campaign under command of Colonel Conrado Villegas.

Within a year Villegas conquered the Neuquén Province (he reached the Limay River). The campaign continued to push the Indian resistance further south, to fight the last battle on October 18, 1884. The last rebel group, with more than 3,000 warriors under the command of chieftains Inacayal and Foyel, surrendered two months later in present Chubut Province.

In the 1880s the Argentine advances effectively disrupted Chileans and German Chilean trade with indigenous communities east of the Andes. This meant the leather merchants in Southern Chile had to cross the Andes and establish livestock operations. As a result, a number of Chilean-owned companies were established in Argentina. They imported workers from Chile, mostly people from Chiloé Archipelago. It was in this context that German Chilean Carlos Weiderhold established the trading post and shop La Alemana in 1895, from which the city of Bariloche developed.

Border clashes
To counteract the Argentine conquest of Patagonia, the Chileans supplied arms, ammunition and horses to their Indian Mapuche allies. On 16 January 1883, a 10-man section of a platoon of the Argentine Army in pursuit of a large Indian war party, ran into an ambush in the Pulmarí Valley set up by Chilean soldiers. In the engagement that followed, Argentine Captain Emilio Crouzeilles, along with Lieutenant Nicolas Lazcano and several privates, were killed.

On 17 February 1883, Lieutenant-Colonel Juan Díaz, at the head of a 16-man Argentine infantry detachment, was trailing a war party of 100 to 150 Indians. Upon reaching Pulmarí Valley, they were surrounded by the Indians and around 50 Chilean soldiers. Much outnumbered, the Argentine soldiers skillfully outfought their attackers, including a bayonet charge mounted by the Chilean detachment. On 21 February 1883, according to Argentine Army Major Manuel Prado, 150-200 Indians armed with Winchesters and Martini–Henry rifles attacked an Argentine Army detachment operating on the Argentine-Chilean border. In a four-hour engagement, 22 Argentine soldiers were killed or wounded at a cost of some 100 warriors.

Historical controversy
Historian Jens Andermann has noted that contemporary sources on the campaign conclude that the Conquest was intended by the Argentine government to exterminate the indigenous tribes, and can be classified as genocide. First-hand accounts state that Argentine troops killed prisoners and committed "mass executions". The 15,000 Natives taken captive "became servants or prisoners and were prevented from having children."

Apologists perceive the campaign as intending to conquer specifically those Indigenous groups who refused to submit to Argentine law and frequently carried out brutal attacks on frontier civilian settlements. In these attacks, the Natives stole many horses and cattle, killed men defending their livestock, and captured women and children to become the slaves and/or forced brides of Indian warriors.

The Guardian alleged in 2011 that two education officials lost their jobs due to the controversy over the Conquest of the Desert: It reported that Juan José Cresto was forced to resign as a director of the Argentine National Historical Museum because he "said the Indians were violent parasites who attacked farms and kidnapped women" and Beatriz Horn, a history teacher in La Pampa Province, was fired for "telling a radio station that Roca deserved praise for putting Indians to flight and opening Argentina's frontier to European settlers." Argentine news sources, however, report Juan José Cresto lost his job for being abusive and violent towards employees and Beatriz Horn was fired primarily due to her praise for the military dictator Leopoldo Galtieri.

In recent years, Mapuche rights groups and other activist organizations have criticised the representation of Roca in official state imagery. A statue of Roca in the civic center of Bariloche is a frequent site for protests and graffiti by local Amerindian rights organizations.

See also
 American Indian Wars
 Selk'nam genocide 
 Araucanization of Patagonia
 Kingdom of Araucania and Patagonia
 Napalpí massacre
 Population history of American indigenous peoples

References

Further reading
"Nicolás Avellaneda", biography by Felipe Pigna 
"Economical consequences of the Conquest of the Desert" - Universidad del CEMA 
"Effective occupation of the Patagonic region by the Argentine government" - Universidad del CEMA 
"Campaña del Desierto" - Olimpiadas Nacionales de Contenidos Educativos en Internet 
"La Guerra del Desierto", different views by Juan José Cresto, Osvaldo Bayer and others - ElOrtiba.org 

 Hasbrouck, Alfred. The Conquest of the DesertThe Hispanic American Historical Review, Vol. 15, No. 2 (May, 1935), pp. 195–228
 Larson, Carolyne R. (ed). The Conquest of the Desert: Argentina's Indigenous Peoples and the Battle for History (University of New Mexico Press, 2020).
 Commandante Manuel Prado: La guerra al Malón 1907
 New edition: Manuel Prado: La guerra al Malón (The War against the Indians), Editorial Claridad SA, Buenos Aires 
Staff, Conquest-of-the-Desert and effect on colonization in Patagonia Encyclopædia Britannica

 
Military campaigns involving Argentina
19th-century colonization of the Americas
19th-century conflicts
Mapuche
Violence against indigenous peoples
Conflicts in Argentina
19th century in Argentina
History of Argentina (1852–1880)
1870s in Argentina
1875 in Argentina
Native American genocide
Genocides in South America